Wester Broom is a district of Edinburgh, Scotland. It borders Broomhouse/Forrester, Corstorphine and South Gyle. It is sometimes considered to be part of one of the latter two. It is mainly residential, with a few small shops and a large Tesco nearby. The Fife railway line is arguably the boundary, although some will extend it south to the Glasgow line, and to include Forresters and two schools.

History
The bulk of Wester Broom was constructed in the late twentieth century.

The footings of a castle/tower house were found here during the construction of the estate, but little else is known about it.

Notable residents
 Martainn Mac an t-Saoir - Gaelic novelist and poet.
 William Neill lived here towards the end of the 1960s.

References

Areas of Edinburgh